Berkshire Medical College (originally the Berkshire Medical Institution, and sometimes referred to as Berkshire Medical College) was a medical school in Pittsfield, Massachusetts. It is notable for establishing the first professorship in mental diseases at any medical school in the United States, and for granting the first medical degree ever issued to an African American.

It originated in 1823 as the Medical Department of Williams College, graduated 1138 people, and was disbanded in 1867.

Notable alumni and faculty 
Elisha Bartlett physician, professor and poet who served in the Massachusetts House of Representatives and as the first mayor of Lowell, Massachusetts
Paul A. Chadbourne, President of University of Wisconsin, Williams College and the Massachusetts Agricultural College (later University of Massachusetts) 
Henry H. Childs, Lieutenant Governor of Massachusetts and President of BMC
Mason C. Darling, Congressman
Pliny Earle (physician), professor of materia medica and psychology at BMC (the first professorship in mental diseases ever established by a medical college in the United States)
Harvey Willson Harkness, mycologist and natural historian
Josiah Gilbert Holland, novelist, poet and newspaperman
Mark Hopkins (educator)
Erasmus Darwin Hudson, abolitionist and orthopedic surgeon
Willard Parker (surgeon), professor of surgery
Charles L. Robinson, physician, abolitionist, newspaperman, California legislator, Kansas Free Stater and first Governor of Kansas
Joseph Pomeroy Root, abolitionist, Kansas Free Stater and statesman
James Skivring Smith, first African American to receive a medical degree and later President of Liberia
George Vasey (botanist), United States Department of Agriculture Chief Botanist and curator of the National Herbarium

References

External links 
Goodhue, Josiah. An inaugural address, delivered before "The Berkshire Medical Institution," at the first annual commencement, December 25, 1823 Pittsfield: Printed by Phineas Allen, 1823?

Educational institutions established in 1823
Educational institutions disestablished in 1867
Defunct private universities and colleges in Massachusetts
Medical schools in Massachusetts
Williams College